77 is a double album and third full-length album by Nude Beach released on Don Giovanni Records in 2014.

Track listing
 All songs written and produced by Chuck Betz

Personnel 
 Chuck Betz - vocals, guitar, harpsichord, producer 
 Jim Shelton - bass
 Ryan Naideau - drums, percussion, vocals
 Andrea Schiavelli - fender rhodes (tracks 1,4, & 18)
 Matthew Winn - harmonica (track 17), vocals (track 13)
 Dave Rahn - mastering
 Alex Decarli - artwork

References

2014 albums
Nude Beach (band) albums
Don Giovanni Records albums